Sahianwala railway station is located in Sahianwala town, Faisalabad district of Punjab province of the Pakistan.

See also
 List of railway stations in Pakistan
 Pakistan Railways

References

External links

Railway stations in Punjab, Pakistan
Railway stations on Sangla Hill–Kundian Branch Line
Railway stations on Khanewal–Wazirabad Line